

Events

January

 January 1 – In a coup, Colonel Jean-Bédel Bokassa takes over as military ruler of the Central African Republic, ousting President David Dacko.
 January 3 – 1966 Upper Voltan coup d'état: President Maurice Yaméogo is deposed by a military coup in the Republic of Upper Volta (modern-day Burkina Faso).
 January 10
 Pakistani–Indian peace negotiations end successfully with the signing of the Tashkent Declaration, a day before the sudden death of Indian prime minister Lal Bahadur Shastri.
 The House of Representatives of the US state of Georgia refuses to allow African-American representative Julian Bond to take his seat, because of his anti-war stance.
 A Commonwealth Prime Ministers' Conference convenes in Lagos, Nigeria, primarily to discuss Rhodesia.
 January 12 – United States President Lyndon Johnson states that the United States should stay in South Vietnam until Communist aggression there is ended.
 January 15 – 1966 Nigerian coup d'état: A bloody military coup is staged in Nigeria, deposing the civilian government and resulting in the death of Prime Minister Abubakar Tafawa Balewa.
 January 17
 The Nigerian coup is overturned by another faction of the military, leaving a military government in power. This is the beginning of a long period of military rule.
 1966 Palomares B-52 crash: A U.S. Air Force B-52 bomber collides with a KC-135 Stratotanker over Spain, dropping three 70-kiloton hydrogen bombs near the town of Palomares, and one into the sea. Carl Brashear, the first African American United States Navy diver, is involved in an accident during the recovery of the latter which results in the amputation of his leg.
 January 19 – Indira Gandhi is elected Prime Minister of India; she is sworn in January 24.
 January 20
 1966 Liberal Party of Australia leadership election: Harold Holt is elected leader of the Liberal Party of Australia unopposed when Sir Robert Menzies retires after an unprecedented 16 years in office; consequently Holt becomes Prime Minister of Australia six days later.
 Demonstrations occur against high food prices in Hungary.
 January 21 – Italian Prime Minister Aldo Moro resigns due to a power struggle in his party.
 January 22
 The military government of Nigeria announces that ex-prime minister Abubakar Tafawa Balewa was killed during the coup a week previously.
 The Chadian Muslim insurgent group FROLINAT is founded in Sudan, starting the Chadian Civil War.
 January 24 – Air India Flight 101 crashes into Mont Blanc, killing all 117 people on board, including Dr. Homi J. Bhabha, chairman of the Indian Atomic Energy Commission.
 January 26 – Beaumont children disappearance: Three children disappear on their way to Glenelg, South Australia, never to be seen again.
 January 27
The British government promises the U.S. that British troops in Malaysia will stay until more peaceful conditions occur in the region.
Britain's Labour Party unexpectedly retains the parliamentary seat of Hull North in a by-election, with a swing of 4.5% to their candidate from the opposition Conservatives, and a majority up from 1,181 at the 1964 General Election to 5,351.
 January 31 – The United Kingdom ceases all trade with Rhodesia.

February

 February 1 – Around 2,600 political prisoners are released by East Germany, in return for "donations" worth approximately $10,000 a head from West Germany.
 February 3 – The unmanned Soviet Luna 9 spacecraft makes the first controlled rocket-assisted landing on the Moon.
 February 4 – All Nippon Airways Flight 60 plunges into Tokyo Bay; 133 people are killed.
 February 7 – Lyndon Johnson of the United States and Nguyễn Cao Kỳ of South Vietnam convene with other officials in a summit in Honolulu, Hawaii to discuss the course of the Vietnam War. 
 February 10 – Soviet fiction writers Yuli Daniel and Andrei Sinyavsky are sentenced to five and seven years, respectively, for "anti-Soviet" writings.
 February 14 – The Australian dollar is introduced at a rate of 2 dollars per pound, or 10 shillings per dollar.
 February 19 – The naval minister of the United Kingdom, Christopher Mayhew, resigns.
 February 20 – While Soviet author and translator Valery Tarsis is abroad, the Soviet Union negates his citizenship.
 February 23 – 1966 Syrian coup d'état: An intra-party military coup in Syria replaces the previous government of Amin al-Hafiz by one led by Salah Jadid.
 February 24 – A coup led by the police and military of Ghana raises the National Liberation Council to power while president Kwame Nkrumah is abroad.
 February 28 – British Prime Minister Harold Wilson calls a General Election in the United Kingdom, to be held on March 31.

March

 March – The DKW automobile ceases production in Germany.
 March 1
The British Government announces plans for the decimalisation of the pound sterling (hitherto denominated in 20 shillings and 240 pence to the £), to come into force on 15 February 1971 (Decimal Day).
Soviet space probe Venera 3 crashes on Venus, becoming the first spacecraft to land on another planet's surface.
The Ba'ath Party takes power in Syria.
 March 2 – Kwame Nkrumah arrives in Guinea and is granted asylum.
 March 4
Canadian Pacific Air Lines Flight 402 crashes during a night landing in poor visibility at Tokyo International Airport in Japan, killing 64 of 72 people on board.
In an interview with London Evening Standard reporter Maureen Cleave, John Lennon of The Beatles states "We're more popular than Jesus now".
 March 5
BOAC Flight 911 crashes in severe clear-air turbulence over Mount Fuji soon after taking off from Tokyo International Airport in Japan, killing all 124 people on board.
"Merci, Chérie" by Udo Jürgens (music by Udo Jürgens, lyrics by Jürgens and Thomas Hörbiger) wins the Eurovision Song Contest 1966 for Austria.
 March 7 – Charles de Gaulle asks U.S. President Lyndon B. Johnson for negotiations about the state of NATO equipment in France.
 March 8
Anti-communist demonstrations occur at the Indonesian Foreign Ministry.
Vietnam War: The U.S. announces it will substantially increase the number of its troops in Vietnam.
Nelson's Pillar in O'Connell Street, Dublin, is clandestinely blown up by former Irish Republican Army volunteers marking this year's 50th anniversary of the Easter Rising.
 March 10 – Crown Princess Beatrix of the Netherlands marries Claus von Amsberg. Some spectators demonstrate against the groom because he is German.
 March 11
Transition to the New Order in Indonesia: President Sukarno gives all executive powers to General Suharto by signing the "Supersemar" order.
French President Charles de Gaulle states that French troops will be taken out of NATO and that all French NATO bases and headquarters must be closed within a year.
 March 16
NASA spacecraft Gemini 8 (David Scott, Neil Armstrong) conducts the first docking in space, with an Agena target vehicle.
Paul Van Doren establishes the Vans shoe company in California.
 March 19 – The Texas Western Miners defeat the Kentucky Wildcats with five African American starters, ushering in desegregation in athletic recruiting.
 March 20 – Football's FIFA World Cup Trophy is stolen while on exhibition in London; it is found seven days later by a mongrel dog named "Pickles" and his owner David Corbett, wrapped in newspaper in a south London garden.
 March 22: in the Chinese city of Xingtai a magnitude 6.8 earthquake leaves more than 8,000 dead and 38,000 injured.
 March 24 – Pope Paul VI meets Michael Ramsey, the Archbishop of Canterbury, in Rome, and gives him an episcopal ring.
 March 26 – Demonstrations are held across the United States against the Vietnam War.
 March 27 – In South Vietnam, 20,000 Buddhists march in demonstrations against the policies of the military government.
 March 28
Cevdet Sunay becomes the fifth president of Turkey.
Indira Gandhi visits Washington, D.C.
 March 29 – The 23rd Congress of the Communist Party of the Soviet Union is held: Leonid Brezhnev demands that U.S. troops leave Vietnam, and announces that Chinese-Soviet relations are not satisfactory.
 March 31
The British Labour Party led by Harold Wilson wins the 1966 United Kingdom general election, gaining a 96-seat majority (compared with a single seat majority when the election was called on February 28).
 The Soviet Union launches Luna 10, which becomes the first space probe to enter orbit around the Moon.

April

 April 2 – The Indonesian army demands that the country rejoin the United Nations.
 April 3 – Luna 10 is the first manmade object to enter lunar orbit.
 April 5 – During the Buddhist Uprising, South Vietnamese military prime minister Nguyễn Cao Kỳ personally attempts to lead the capture of the restive city of Đà Nẵng before backing down.
 April 7 – The United Kingdom asks the United Nations Security Council for authority to use force to stop oil tankers that violate the embargo against Rhodesia (authority is given April 10).
 April 8
 Buddhists in South Vietnam protest against the fact that the new government has not set a date for free elections.
 Leonid Brezhnev becomes General Secretary of the Soviet Union, as well as Leader of the Communist Party of the U.S.S.R.
 April 14 
 Kenyan Vice President Oginga Odinga resigns, saying "invisible government" representing foreign interests now runs the country. He will head a new party, the Kenya People's Union. 
The South Vietnamese government promises free elections in 3–5 months.
 April 15 – An anti-Nasser conspiracy is exposed in Egypt.
 April 18
 China declares that it will stop economic aid to Indonesia.
 The 38th Academy Awards ceremony is held in Santa Monica, California: The Sound of Music wins Best Picture.
 April 21
 An artificial heart is installed in the chest of Marcel DeRudder in a Houston, Texas, hospital.
 The opening of the Parliament of the United Kingdom is televised for the first time.
 Haile Selassie visits Jamaica for the first time, meeting with Rasta leaders.
 Moors murders: Ian Brady and Myra Hindley go on trial at Chester Crown Court in north west England for the murders of 3 children who vanished between November 1963 and October 1965.
 April 24 – Uniform daylight saving time is first observed in most parts of North America.
 April 26 
 A new government is formed in the Republic of the Congo, led by Ambroise Noumazalaye.
 The magnitude 5.1 Tashkent earthquake affects the largest city in Soviet Central Asia with a maximum MSK intensity of VII (Very strong). Tashkent is mostly destroyed and 15–200 are killed.
 April 27 – Pope Paul VI and Soviet Foreign Minister Andrei Gromyko meet in the Vatican (the first meeting between leaders of the Roman Catholic Church and the Soviet Union).
 April 28 – In Rhodesia, security forces kill seven ZANLA men in combat; Chimurenga, the ZANU rebellion, begins.
 April 30 – Regular hovercraft service begins over the English Channel (discontinued in 2000).

May

 May 4
 Fiat signs a contract with the Soviet government to build a car factory in the Soviet Union.
 May 1966 lunar eclipse: A penumbral lunar eclipse takes place, the 64th lunar eclipse of Lunar Saros 111.
 May 5 – The Montreal Canadiens defeat the Detroit Red Wings to win the Stanley Cup in ice hockey.
 May 6 – The Moors murders trial ends in the UK with Ian Brady being found guilty on all three counts of murder and sentenced to three concurrent terms of life imprisonment. Myra Hindley is convicted on two counts of murder and of being an accessory in the third murder committed by Brady, receiving two concurrent terms of life imprisonment and a seven-year fixed term for being an accessory.
 May 7 – Irish bank workers go on strike. 
 May 12
 African members of the UN Security Council say that the British army should blockade Rhodesia.
 Radio Peking claims that U.S. planes have shot down a Chinese plane over Yunnan (the U.S. denies the story the next day).
 May 14 – Turkey and Greece intend to start negotiations about the situation in Cyprus.
 May 15
 Indonesia asks Malaysia for peace negotiations.
 The South Vietnamese army besieges Da Nang.
 Tens of thousands of anti-war demonstrators again picket the White House, then rally at the Washington Monument.
 May 16
 The Chinese Communist Party issues the 'May 16 Notice', marking the beginning of the Cultural Revolution.
 A strike is called by the National Union of Seamen in the United Kingdom.
 In New York City, Dr. Martin Luther King Jr. makes his first public speech on the Vietnam War.
 May 19 – Gertrude Baniszewski is found guilty of torturing and murdering 16-year-old Sylvia Likens at a court in Indianapolis, United States, and is sentenced to life in prison (she is released on parole in December 1985).
 May 24
 Battle of Mengo Hill: Ugandan army troops arrest Mutesa II of Buganda and occupy his palace.
 The Nigerian government forbids all political activity in the country until January 17, 1969.
 May 25
 Explorer program: Satellite Explorer 32 (Atmosphere Explorer-B) is launched from the United States.
 No. 9 Squadron RAAF becomes part of the 4,500 strong Australian Task Force assigned to duties in Vietnam, leaving for Southeast Asia aboard the aircraft carrier HMAS Sydney.
 May 26 – British Guiana achieves independence, becoming Guyana.
 May 28
 Fidel Castro declares martial law in Cuba because of a possible U.S. attack.
 The Indonesian and Malaysian governments declare that the Indonesia–Malaysia confrontation is over (a treaty is signed on August 11).
 Boat ride "It's a Small World" opens at Disneyland.
 May 29 – Sports stadium Estadio Azteca officially opens in Mexico City in advance of the 1968 Summer Olympics.
 May 31 – The Philippines reestablishes diplomatic relations with Malaysia.

June

 June 2
 Éamon de Valera is re-elected as Irish president.
 Surveyor program: Surveyor 1 lands in Oceanus Procellarum on the Moon, becoming the first U.S. spacecraft to soft-land on another world.
 Four former cabinet ministers including Évariste Kimba are executed in the Democratic Republic of the Congo, for alleged involvement in a plot to kill Mobutu Sese Seko.
 June 3 – Joaquín Balaguer is elected president of the Dominican Republic.
 June 5 – Gemini 9A: Gene Cernan completes the second U.S. spacewalk (2 hours, 7 minutes).
 June 6 – Civil rights activist James Meredith is shot by a sniper while traversing Mississippi in the March Against Fear.
 June 8
 A North American XB-70 Valkyrie strategic bomber prototype is destroyed in a mid-air collision with an F-104 Starfighter chase plane during a photo shoot. NASA pilot Joseph A. Walker and USAF test pilot Carl Cross are both killed.
 1966 Topeka tornado: Topeka, Kansas is devastated by a tornado that registers as an "F5" on the Fujita scale, the first to exceed US$100 million in damages. Sixteen people are killed, hundreds more injured and thousands of homes damaged or destroyed, and the campus of Washburn University suffers catastrophic damage.
 June 12 – Chicago's Division Street riots begin in response to police shooting of a young Puerto Rican man. 
 June 13 – Miranda v. Arizona: The Supreme Court of the United States rules that the police must inform suspects of their rights before questioning them.
 June 14 – The Vatican abolishes the Index Librorum Prohibitorum. 
 June 17 – An Air France personnel strike begins.
 June 18 – CIA chief William Raborn resigns; Richard Helms becomes his successor.
 June 28 – Argentine Revolution: In Argentina, a military junta calling itself Revolución Argentina deposes president Arturo Umberto Illia in a coup and appoints General Juan Carlos Onganía to power.
 June 29
 Vietnam War: U.S. planes begin bombing Hanoi and Haiphong.
 The strike by the National Union of Seamen in the United Kingdom is called off.
 June 30
 France formally leaves NATO.
 The National Organization for Women (NOW) is founded in Washington, D.C.

July

 July 1 – Joaquín Balaguer becomes president of the Dominican Republic.
 July 3
31 people are arrested when a demonstration by approximately 4,000 anti-Vietnam War protesters in front of the United States Embassy in London in Grosvenor Square turns violent.
René Barrientos is elected President of Bolivia.
 July 6 – Malawi becomes a republic.
 July 7 – A Warsaw Pact conference ends with a promise to support North Vietnam.
 July 8 – King Mwambutsa IV Bangiriceng of Burundi is deposed by his son Ntare V, who is in turn deposed by prime minister Michel Micombero.
 July 11 – The 1966 FIFA World Cup begins in England.
 July 12
 Indira Gandhi visits Moscow.
 Zambia threatens to leave the Commonwealth of Nations because of British peace overtures to Rhodesia.
 July 13 – The International Society for Krishna Consciousness is founded in New York City by A. C. Bhaktivedanta Swami Prabhupada.
 July 14
 Israeli and Syrian jet fighters clash over the Jordan River.
 Richard Speck murders 8 student nurses in their Chicago dormitory. He is arrested on July 17.
 Gwynfor Evans, President of Plaid Cymru, the Welsh nationalist party, becomes Member of the United Kingdom Parliament for Carmarthen, taking the previously Labour-held Welsh seat at a by-election with a majority of 2,435 on an 18% swing and giving his party its first representation at Westminster in its forty-one year history.
 July 18
 Gemini 10 (John Young, Michael Collins) is launched from the United States. After docking with an Agena target vehicle, the astronauts set a world altitude record of 474 miles (763 km).
 The International Court of Justice rules in favour of South Africa in a case on the administration of South West Africa which has been brought before them by Ethiopia and Liberia.
 July 22 – Following the death of Hsu Tsu-tsai, an engineer, in The Hague, the Chinese government declares Dutch delegate G. J. Jongejans persona non grata, but tells him not to leave the country before other Chinese engineers have left the Netherlands.
 July 23 – Katangese troops in Stanleyville, Congo, revolt for several weeks in support of the exiled minister Moise Tshombe.
 July 24 – U.N. Secretary General U Thant visits Moscow.
 July 26 – Lord Gardiner issues the Practice Statement in the House of Lords of the United Kingdom, stating that the House is not bound to follow its own previous precedent.
 July 28 – The U.S. announces that a Lockheed U-2 reconnaissance plane has disappeared over Cuba.
 July 29
 1966 Nigerian counter-coup: Army officers from the north of Nigeria execute head of state General Aguiyi-Ironsi and install Yakubu Gowon.
 La Noche de los Bastones Largos: Junta takes over Argentine universities.
 Bob Dylan is injured in a motorcycle accident near his home in Woodstock, New York. He is not seen in public for over a year.
 July 30 – England beats West Germany 4–2 to win the 1966 FIFA World Cup at Wembley after extra time.
 July 31 – The pleasure cruiser MV Darlwyne disappeared off the Cornwall coast with the loss of all 31 aboard.

August

 August 1
 Sniper Charles Whitman kills 14 people and wounds 32 from atop the University of Texas at Austin Main Building tower, after earlier killing his wife and mother.
 The British Colonial Office merges with the Commonwealth Relations Office to form a new Commonwealth Office.
 August 2 – The Spanish government forbids overflights by British military aircraft.
 August 5
 Groundbreaking takes place for the World Trade Center in New York City.
 Martin Luther King Jr. leads a civil rights march in Chicago, during which he is struck by a rock thrown from an angry white mob.
 The Caesars Palace hotel and casino opens in Las Vegas.
 August 6
 Braniff Flight 250 crashes in Falls City, Nebraska, killing all 42 on board.
 René Barrientos takes office as the President of Bolivia.
 The Salazar Bridge (later the 25 de Abril Bridge) opens in Lisbon, Portugal.
 August 10
 An East German court sentences Günter Laudahn to life imprisonment for spying for the United States.
 Lunar Orbiter 1, the first U.S. spacecraft to orbit the moon, is launched.
 August 11
 Indonesia and Malaysia issue a joint peace declaration, formally ending the Indonesia–Malaysia confrontation which began in 1963.
 The Beatles hold a press conference in Chicago, during which John Lennon apologizes for his "more popular than Jesus" remark, saying, "I didn't mean it as a lousy anti-religious thing."
 August 12 – Massacre of Braybrook Street: Harry Roberts, John Duddy and Jack Witney shoot dead 3 plainclothes policemen in London; they are later sentenced to life imprisonment.
 August 15 – Syrian and Israeli troops clash over Lake Kinneret (also known as the Sea of Galilee) for 3 hours.
 August 17 – Saudi Arabia and the United Arab Republic begin negotiations in Kuwait to end the war in Yemen.
 August 18 – Vietnam War – Battle of Long Tan: D Company, 6th Battalion of the Royal Australian Regiment, meets and defeats a Viet Cong force estimated to be four times larger, in Phuoc Tuy Province, Republic of Vietnam.
 August 19 – The 6.8  Varto earthquake affects the town of Varto in eastern Turkey with a maximum Mercalli intensity of IX (Violent), killing at least 2,394–3,000 and injuring at least 1,420.
 August 21 – Seven men are sentenced to death in Egypt for anti-Nasser agitation.
 August 22
 The Asian Development Bank (ADB) is established.
 The United Farm Workers Organizing Committee (UFWOC), predecessor of the United Farm Workers of America (UFW), is formed.
 August 26 – The first battle of the South African Air Force and the South African Police with PLAN, the armed wing of the South West Africa People's Organization (SWAPO), takes place at Ongulumbashe during Operation Blue Wildebeest, triggering the South African Border War which continues until 1989.
 August 29 – The Beatles end their U.S. tour with a concert at Candlestick Park in San Francisco. It is their last performance as a live touring band.
 August 30 – France offers independence to French Somaliland (Djibouti from 1977).

September

 September 1
 United Nations Secretary-General U Thant declares that he will not seek re-election, because U.N. efforts in Vietnam have failed.
 98 British tourists die when Britannia Airways Flight 105 crashes in Ljubljana, Yugoslavia.
 September 6 – South African Prime Minister Hendrik Verwoerd is stabbed to death in Parliament by Dimitri Tsafendas.
 September 9 – NATO decides to move Supreme Headquarters Allied Powers Europe to Belgium.
 September 12 
 Gemini 11 (Richard F. Gordon, Jr., Pete Conrad) docks with an Agena target vehicle.
 B. J. Vorster becomes the new Prime Minister of South Africa.
 September 13 – Cultural Revolution in China: Clashes between the Chinese Communist Party and the Red Guards are reported by TASS in the Soviet Union.
 September 16
 In South Vietnam, Thích Trí Quang ends a 100-day hunger strike.
 The Metropolitan Opera House opens at Lincoln Center in New York City with the world premiere of Samuel Barber's opera Antony and Cleopatra.
 September 19 – Indonesian military commander (later President) Suharto announces the resumption of Indonesian participation in the United Nations.
 September 29 – Hurricane Inez strikes Hispaniola, leaving thousands dead and tens of thousands homeless in the Dominican Republic and Haiti.
 September 30
 The Bechuanaland Protectorate in Africa achieves independence from the United Kingdom as Botswana, with Seretse Khama as its first President.
 Baldur von Schirach and Albert Speer are released from Spandau Prison in West Berlin.

October

 October – Bobby Seale and Huey P. Newton found the Black Panther Party in the United States.
 October 3 – Tunisia severs diplomatic relations with the United Arab Republic.
 October 4
 Israel applies for membership in the European Economic Community, which is never granted.
 Basutoland becomes independent of the United Kingdom and takes the name Lesotho.
 October 5
 UNESCO signs the Recommendation Concerning the Status of Teachers. This event is to be celebrated as World Teachers' Day.
 Spain closes its Gibraltar border to vehicular traffic.
 An experimental breeder reactor at the Enrico Fermi Nuclear Generating Station in Michigan suffers a partial meltdown when its cooling system fails.
 October 6 
 LSD is made illegal in the United States and controlled so strictly that not only are possession and recreational use criminalized, but all legal scientific research programs on the drug in the country are shut down as well.
 The Love Pageant Rally takes place in the Panhandle of Golden Gate Park (a narrow section that projects into San Francisco's Haight-Ashbury district).
 October 7 – The Soviet Union declares that all Chinese students must leave the country before the end of October.
 October 9 – Vietnam War: Binh Tai Massacre.
 October 11 – France and the Soviet Union sign a treaty for cooperation in nuclear research.
 October 14 
 Closure of Intra Bank begins a crisis in the Lebanese banking system.
 The city of Montreal inaugurates the Montreal Metro system.
 October 17 – Lesotho and Botswana are admitted to the United Nations.
 October 21
 Aberfan disaster in South Wales (U.K.): 144 (including 116 children) are killed by a collapsing coal spoil tip.
 The AFL-NFL merger in American football is approved by the U.S. Congress.
 October 22 – Spain demands that the United Kingdom stop military flights to Gibraltar; Britain refuses the next day.
 October 26
 NATO decides to move its headquarters from Paris to Brussels.
 A fire aboard the aircraft carrier  in the Gulf of Tonkin kills 44 crewmen.
 October 27 
 The United Nations terminates the mandate given by the League of Nations and proclaims that South West Africa will be administrated by the United Nations. This is rejected by South Africa.
 Walt Disney records his final filmed appearance prior to his death, detailing his plans for EPCOT, a utopian planned city to be built in Florida.

November

 November 1 – The National Football League in the United States awards its sixteenth franchise to the city of New Orleans. The team will be named the New Orleans Saints.
 November 2 – The Cuban Adjustment Act comes into force, allowing 123,000 Cubans the opportunity to apply for permanent residency in the United States.
In addition, a severe tidal flood hits Venice.
 November 5 – Thirty-eight African states demand that the United Kingdom use force against the Rhodesian government.
 November 6 – Lunar Orbiter 2 is launched.
 November 8 – Screen actor Ronald Reagan is elected Governor of California.
 November 10 – Seán Lemass retires as Taoiseach of the Republic of Ireland to be replaced in the role by fellow Fianna Fáil member Jack Lynch.
 November 11
 A mine kills 3 Israeli paratroopers on the West Bank border.
 Spain declares general amnesty for crimes committed during the Spanish Civil War, effective only for the Falangists' side.
 November 12 – Total solar eclipse occurs, the 20th solar eclipse of Solar Saros 142.
 November 14 – Jack L. Warner sells Warner Bros. to Seven Arts Productions, which eventually becomes Warner Bros.-Seven Arts.
 November 15
 A Boeing 727 freighter on Pan Am Flight 708 crashes near Berlin, Germany, killing all three crew on board.
 Two young couples in Point Pleasant, West Virginia reportedly see a strange moth-like creature, which would become known as the Mothman.
 November 17
 The U.N. General Assembly decides to found the United Nations Industrial Development Organization.
 A spectacular Leonid meteor shower passes over Arizona, at the rate of 2,300 a minute for 20 minutes.
 November 21 – In Togo, the army crushes an attempted coup.
 November 24 
 The Beatles begin recording sessions for their Sgt. Pepper's Lonely Hearts Club Band album at Abbey Road Studios in London.
 TABSO Flight 101, from Sofia, Bulgaria, crashes near Bratislava, Czechoslovakia, killing all 82 people on board.
 November 26 
 1966 Australian federal election: Harold Holt's Liberal/Country Coalition Government is re-elected with a significantly increased majority, defeating the Labor Party led by Arthur Calwell. Calwell resigns as Labor leader shortly after; he will be replaced by his deputy and future Prime Minister Gough Whitlam.
 In the Canadian Football League, the Saskatchewan Roughriders defeat the Ottawa Rough Riders to win the 54th Grey Cup at Vancouver's Empire Stadium 29–14. Saskatchewan were led by quarterback Ron Lancaster.
 November 27 – The Washington Redskins defeat the New York Giants 72–41 in the highest scoring game in National Football League history.
 November 28 – Truman Capote's Black and White Ball ('The Party of the Century') is held in New York City.
 November 29 – The  sinks in a storm on Lake Huron, killing 28 of 29 crewmen.
 November 30 – Barbados achieves independence from the United Kingdom.

December

 December 1
 Kurt Georg Kiesinger is elected Chancellor of West Germany.
 British Prime Minister Harold Wilson and Rhodesian Prime minister Ian Smith negotiate aboard  in the Mediterranean.
 December 2 – U Thant agrees to serve a second term as United Nations Secretary General.
 December 3 – Anti-Portuguese demonstrations occur in Macau; a curfew is declared the next day.
 December 5 – The U.S. Supreme Court rules in Bond v. Floyd that the Georgia House of Representatives must seat Julian Bond, having violated his First and Fourteenth Amendment rights.
 December 6 – Vietnam War: Bình Hòa massacre.
 December 7
 Syria offers weapons to rebels in Jordan.
 Barbados is admitted to the United Nations.
 December 8 – The Typaldos Line's ferry  sinks in rough seas in the Aegean Sea near Crete, leaving 217 dead.
 December 12 – Harry Roberts, John Whitney and John Duddy are sentenced to life imprisonment (each with a recommended minimum of 30 years) for the Shepherd's Bush murders of three London policemen on August 12. Roberts, arrested on November 15 north of London, will eventually spend nearly 48 years in prison.
 December 16
 The United Nations Security Council approves an oil embargo against Rhodesia.
 The International Covenant on Economic, Social and Cultural Rights and the International Covenant on Civil and Political Rights are adopted by the General Assembly, as Resolution 2200 A (XXI).
 December 17 – South Africa does not join the trade embargo against Rhodesia.
 December 19 – The Asian Development Bank begins operations.
 December 20 – U.K. Prime Minister Harold Wilson withdraws all his previous offers to the Rhodesian government and announces that he will agree to independence for the country only after the establishment of a Black majority government there.
 December 22 – Prime Minister Ian Smith declares that Rhodesia is already a republic.
 December 24 – New York television station WPIX broadcasts The Yule Log for the first time; it becomes a Christmas tradition.
 December 25 – Marionette sci-fi series Thunderbirds airs its final episode on ITV in the United Kingdom with a Christmas special.
 December 26 – The first Kwanzaa is celebrated by Maulana Karenga, founder of Organization US (a black nationalist group) and chair of Black Studies at California State University, Long Beach, from 1989 to 2002.
 December 31
 East German Premier Walter Ulbricht discusses negotiations about German reunification.
 Eight paintings worth millions of pounds are stolen from Dulwich Picture Gallery in London, but are recovered locally within a week.
 The Congolese government takes over the Union Minière du Haut Katanga.

Date unknown
 Konstantin Chernenko, later leader of the Soviet Union, becomes a candidate member of the Central Committee.
 Paramount Pictures Corporation becomes a wholly owned subsidiary of Gulf+Western Industries, Inc.
 Lise Meitner and Otto Hahn are awarded the Fermi Prize.
 The Congress of the United States creates the National Council for Marine Resources and Engineering Development.
 Martin Richards designs the programming language BCPL.
 The World Buddhist Sangha Council is convened by Theravadins in Sri Lanka, with the hope of bridging differences and working together.
 The Jerusalem Bible, a Roman Catholic translation, is published in English.
 Peter L. Berger and Thomas Luckmann publish The Social Construction of Reality.
 Long-term potentiation (LTP), the putative cellular mechanism of learning and memory, is first observed by Terje Lømo in Oslo, Norway.
 In or about this year, one person returning to Haiti from the Congo is thought to have first brought HIV to the Americas.

Births

January

 January 1 – Ivica Dačić, Serbian politician, Prime Minister of Serbia 2012–2014
 January 4 – Christian Kern, Austrian politician, 24th Chancellor of Austria
 January 6 – Sharon Cuneta, Filipino actress, host and singer
 January 7 – Corrie Sanders, South African boxer (d. 2012)
 January 8
 Igor Vyazmikin, Russian ice hockey player (d. 2009)
 Andrew Wood, American musician (d. 1990)
 January 13 – Patrick Dempsey, American actor and race car driver
 January 14
 Nadia Maftouni, Iranian philosopher
 Dan Schneider, American television producer, screenwriter and actor
 January 17
 Shabba Ranks, Jamaican singer
 Nobuyuki Kojima, Korean footballer
 January 19
 Floris Jan Bovelander, Dutch field-hockey player
 Stefan Edberg, Swedish tennis player
 Lena Philipsson, Swedish singer and media personality
 January 20 – Rainn Wilson, American actor, writer and producer
 January 22 – Jegath Gaspar Raj, Tamil Maiyam founder
 January 27 – Japanese–born American actress
 January 28 – Andrea Berg, German singer
 January 29 – Romário, Brazilian footballer and politician

February

 February 1 – Michelle Akers, American footballer
 February 4 – María Jesús Montero, Spanish politician
 February 5 – José María Olazábal, Spanish golfer
 February 6 – Rick Astley, British pop musician
 February 7 – Kristin Otto, German swimmer
 February 8 – Hristo Stoichkov, Bulgarian footballer
 February 9 – Ellen van Langen, Dutch athlete
 February 11 – Cristina Elena Grigoraș, Romanian artistic gymnast
 February 13 – Neal McDonough, American actor
 February 17 
 Quorthon, Swedish singer, songwriter, musician and record producer (d. 2004)
 Atle Skårdal, Norwegian alpine skier
 February 20 – Cindy Crawford, American model and actress
 February 22 – Rachel Dratch, American actress and comedian
 February 23
Alexandre Borges, Brazilian actor
Didier Queloz, Swiss-born astronomer, Nobel Prize laureate
 February 24 – Billy Zane, American actor
 February 25
 Samson Kitur, Kenyan athlete
 Téa Leoni, American actress
 February 26
 Jennifer Grant, American actress
 Najwa Karam, Lebanese singer
 February 27 – Alison Gertz, American AIDS activist (d. 1992)
 February 28
 Paulo Futre, Portuguese footballer
 Ickey Woods, American football player

March

 March 1 – Zack Snyder, American actor, film director, screenwriter and producer
 March 2 – Sheren Tang, Hong Kong actress
 March 3
 Fernando Colunga, Mexican actor
 Vander Lee, Brazilian singer-songwriter (d. 2016)
 Tone Lōc, African American R&B musician
 March 4
 Steve Bastoni, Australian actor
 Kevin Johnson, American basketball player
 March 9 – Tony Lockett, Australian rules footballer
 March 10 – Edie Brickell, American singer
 March 13 – Chico Science, Brazilian musician (d. 1997)
 March 17 – Espen Hammer, Norwegian philosopher
 March 18 – Jerry Cantrell, American guitarist and singer
 March 22
 Pia Cayetano, Filipino politician, and lawyer
 Martha McSally, American politician and military pilot
 Antonio Pinto, Portuguese long-distance runner
 March 23 – Karin Enström, Swedish politician
 March 25
 Tom Glavine, American baseball player, MLB Hall of Fame member
 Jeff Healey, Canadian guitarist (d. 2008)
 Anton Rogan, Northern Irish footballer
 Remig Stumpf, German cyclist (d. 2019)
 March 26 – Michael Imperioli, American actor
 March 29 – Krasimir Balakov, Bulgarian footballer

April

 April 2 – Teddy Sheringham, British footballer
 April 8
 Cynthia Nixon, American actress
 Robin Wright, American actress
 April 11 – Lisa Stansfield, British soul singer
 April 13 – Ali Boumnijel, Tunisian footballer
 April 14 - Greg Maddux, American baseball player, MLB Hall of Fame member
 April 15 – Samantha Fox, British model and singer
 April 17 – Vikram, Indian actor
 April 18 – Trine Hattestad, Norwegian athlete
 April 20 – David Chalmers, Australian philosopher
 April 22 – Jeffrey Dean Morgan, American actor
 April 25 – Man Arenas, Spanish comic creator
 April 26 
 Andrea Temesvári, Hungarian tennis player
 Natasha Trethewey, Pulitzer Prize–winning poet
 April 27 
 Siw Anita Andersen Norwegian actress
 Yoshihiro Togashi, Japanese author and illustrator
 April 28 – Ali-Reza Pahlavi, titular prince of Iran (d. 2011)

May

 May 3 – Firdous Bamji, Indian-American actor
 May 5 – Lyubov Yegorova, Russian cross-country skier
 May 6
 Andrea Chiesa, Swiss Formula One driver
 Cindy Hsu, American Emmy Award-winning journalist
 May 7
 Anderson Cummins, Canadian cricketer
 Jes Høgh, Danish footballer
 May 8
 Robert J. Behnen, American genealogist and politician 
 Kamil Kašťák, Czech ice hockey player
 Marta Sánchez, Spanish female vocalist, entertainer
 Cláudio Taffarel, Brazilian goalkeeper
 May 10
 Mikael Andersson, Swedish ice hockey player
 Jonathan Edwards, British athlete
 Anne Elvebakk, Norwegian biathlete
 Genaro Hernández, Mexican-American boxer
 Wade Dominguez, American actor, model, singer and dancer (d. 1998)
 May 12
 Stephen Baldwin, American actor
 Bebel Gilberto, Brazilian popular singer
 May 13
 Cheryl Dunye, Liberian-born film director, producer, screenwriter, editor and actress
 Darius Rucker, African American country singer
 May 16
 Janet Jackson, African American R&B singer
 Juan Manuel Funes, Guatemalan footballer and coach
 May 17
 Hill Harper, American actor
 Qusay Hussein, Iraqi politician (d. 2003)
 May 19 – Polly Walker, English actress
 May 21
 Lisa Edelstein, American actress and playwright
 François Omam-Biyik, Cameroonian football player
 May 22 – Siri Eftedal, Norwegian team handball player and Olympic medalist
 May 23
 H. Jon Benjamin, American actor and comedian 
 Graeme Hick, English cricketer
 May 24
 Eric Cantona, French footballer
 Francisco Javier Cruz, Mexican football player
 Russell Kun, Nauruan politician
 May 25 – Ahmad Reza Abedzadeh, Iranian goalkeeper
 May 26
 Helena Bonham Carter, English actress
 Zola Budd, South African athlete
 May 27
 Heston Blumenthal, British chef
 Carol Campbell, Afro-German actress, model and presenter
 May 30 – Thomas Häßler, German football player

June

 June 3 – Wasim Akram, Pakistani cricketer
 June 4
 Cecilia Bartoli, Italian mezzo-soprano
 Svetlana Jitomirskaya, American mathematician
 Vladimir Voevodsky, Russian mathematician (d. 2017)
 June 6 – Faure Gnassingbé, President of Togo
 June 7 – Tom McCarthy, American film director and actor
 June 8
 Jens Kidman, Swedish musician
 Julianna Margulies, American actress and producer
 June 13 – Grigori Perelman, Russian mathematician
 June 14 – Eduardo Waghorn, Chilean musician
 June 15 – Roberto Carnevale, Italian musician
 June 16 – Jan Železný, Czech javelin thrower
 June 18 – Kurt Browning, Canadian figure skater
 June 19 – Samuel West, British actor
 June 22
 Michael Park, British rally co-driver (d. 2005)
 Emmanuelle Seigner, French actress
 Dean Woods, Australian cyclist and Olympic champion (d. 2022)
 June 23 – Richie Jen, Taiwanese musician
 June 24 – Adrienne Shelly, American actress, film director and screenwriter (d. 2006)
 June 25 – Dikembe Mutombo, Congolese basketball player
 June 26 – Dany Boon, French comedian and filmmaker
 June 27 – J. J. Abrams, American television writer and producer
 June 28
 John Cusack, American actor
 Mary Stuart Masterson, American actress
 June 29 – Basuki Tjahaja Purnama, Indonesian politician, governor of Jakarta
 June 30
 Cheryl Bernard, Canadian Olympic curler
 Marton Csokas, New Zealand actor
 Mike Tyson, African American boxer

July

 July 1
 Enrico Annoni, Italian footballer
 Samir Rifai, Prime Minister of Jordan
 July 3 – František Štorm, Czech musician (Master's Hammer) and typographer
 July 5 – Gianfranco Zola, Italian footballer
 July 8 – Shadlog Bernicke, Nauruan politician
 July 9 – Pamela Adlon, American actress, voice actress, screenwriter, producer and director
 July 10 – Gina Bellman, New Zealand-British actress
 July 11 – Kentaro Miura, Japanese author and illustrator
 July 14 – Matthew Fox, American actor
 July 15
 Irène Jacob, French-born actress
 Kristoff St. John, American actor (d. 2019)
 July 16
 Frankie Gan Joon Zin, Malaysian politician
 Waytha Moorthy Ponnusamy, Malaysian lawyer
 July 18
 Lori Alan, American actress and voice actress
 Dan O'Brien, American athlete
 July 20 – Enrique Peña Nieto, President of Mexico (2012-2018), Governor of the State of Mexico (2005–2011)
 July 21 – Sarah Waters, British novelist
 July 26 – Angelo Di Livio, Italian footballer
 July 28 – Miguel Ángel Nadal, Spanish footballer
 July 29
 Richard Steven Horvitz, American actor and voice actor
 Martina McBride, American country music singer
 July 30
 Murilo Bustamante, Brazilian mixed martial artist
 Kerry Fox, New Zealand actress
 July 31 – Dean Cain, American actor

August

 August 5 – James Gunn, American filmmaker 
 August 7 
 Harith Iskander, Malaysian actor and comedian
 Jimmy Wales, American-British entrepreneur, co-founder of Wikipedia
 August 10
 Charlie Dimmock, English TV gardening expert
 Hossam Hassan, Egyptian footballer
 André Sogliuzzo, American actor and voice actor
 August 11 – Juan María Solare, Argentine composer
 August 12 – Les Ferdinand, English footballer
 August 14
 Halle Berry, American actress
 Freddy Rincón, Colombian footballer (d. 2022)
 August 17 – Rodney Mullen, American skateboarder
 August 19 – Lee Ann Womack, American musician
 August 20
 Dimebag Darrell, American guitarist (d. 2004)
 Enrico Letta, 55th Prime Minister of Italy
 Liu Chunyan, Chinese voice actress and host
 August 23 – Rik Smits, Dutch basketball player
 August 26 
 Jacques Brinkman, Dutch field hockey player
 Shirley Manson, Scottish musician
 August 27 
 Jeroen Duyster, Dutch rower
 Rosângela Lula da Silva, sociologist and the First Lady of Brazil
 Juhan Parts, 15th Prime Minister of Estonia
 August 28 – Priya Dutt, Indian social worker and politician

September

 September 1 – Tim Hardaway, American basketball player
 September 2 – Salma Hayek, Mexican-American actress
 September 4 – Yanka Dyagileva, Russian singer (d. 1991)
 September 6
 Emil Boc, 61st Prime Minister of Romania
 Eduardo Maruri, Ecuadorian businessman and politician
 September 7
 Vladimir Andreyev, Russian race walker
 Toby Jones, English actor
 Gunda Niemann-Stirnemann, German speed skater
 September 8 – Carola Häggkvist, Swedish pop singer, Eurovision Song Contest 1991 winner
 September 9
 Georg Hackl, German luger
 Adam Sandler, American actor and comedian
 September 12 
 Anousheh Ansari, Iranian born-American engineer and astronaut
 Steve Ells, American entrepreneur and founder of Chipotle Mexican Grill 
 Princess Akishino of Japan
 Malu Mader, Brazilian actress
 September 20 – Nuno Bettencourt, Portuguese-American guitarist and singer-songwriter 
 September 21 – Nechirvan Barzani, President of Iraqi Kurdistan
 September 22
 Erdoğan Atalay, German actor
 Moustafa Amar, Egyptian singer 
 September 25 – Jason Flemyng, English actor
 September 28 – Maria Canals-Barrera, American actress
 September 29 – Bujar Nishani, President of Albania (d. 2022)

October

 October 1 
 Ashab Uddin, Indian politician
 George Weah, Liberian politician and football player
 October 2 – Rodney Anoa'i, Samoan-American professional wrestler (d. 2000)
 October 3 – Rabbi Binyamin Ze'ev Kahane, Israeli settler leader (d. 2000)
 October 5 – Inessa Kravets, Ukrainian athlete
 October 6 – Niall Quinn, Irish footballer
 October 7 – Sherman Alexie, Native American author
 October 8 – Aaron Callaghan, Irish football club executive
 October 9 – David Cameron, Prime Minister of the United Kingdom
 October 10
 Tony Adams, English footballer
 Carolyn Bertozzi, American chemist, Nobel Prize laureate
 Bai Ling, Chinese actress
 Elana Meyer, South African athlete 
 October 11 – Luke Perry, American actor (d. 2019)
 October 15
 Eric Benét, African American singer-songwriter
 Jorge Campos, Mexican footballer and coach
 October 18 – Angela Visser, Dutch winner of Miss Universe 1989
 October 19 – Jon Favreau, American actor and director
 October 20 – Stefan Raab, German entertainer, television host, comedian and musician
 October 22 – Valeria Golino, Italian-Greek film and television actress
 October 24 – Roman Abramovich, UK-based Russian billionaire businessman 
 October 25 – Wendel Clark, Canadian hockey player
 October 28 – Andy Richter, American actor, writer, comedian and late night talk show announcer
 October 30 – Zoran Milanović, Croatian politician, President of Croatia
 October 31
Adam Horovitz, American rapper 
Mike O'Malley, American actor and playwright

November

November 2
David Schwimmer, American actor
 November 3 – Joe Hachem, Lebanese-born Australian poker player
 November 8 – Gordon Ramsay, Scottish-born chef, restaurateur and television personality
 November 11
 Benedicta Boccoli, Italian model and actress
 Peaches, Canadian musician 
 November 13 – Susanna Haapoja, Finnish politician (d. 2009)
 November 15 – Rachel True, American actress
 November 17
 Jeff Buckley, American singer-songwriter (d. 1997)
 Daisy Fuentes, Cuban-born American model and television personality
 Sophie Marceau, French actress
 November 19
 Gail Devers, American track and field athlete
 Jason Scott Lee, American actor and martial artist
 November 22 
 Orlando Jorge Mera, Dominican politician (d. 2022)
 Michael K. Williams, American actor (d. 2021)
 November 23 
Vincent Cassel, French actor
Michelle Gomez, Scottish actress
 November 24 – Juan Pablo Gamboa, Colombian actor
 November 25
 Billy Burke, American actor
 Roberto Rojas, Bolivian politician (d. 2022)
 November 26 – Garcelle Beauvais, Haitian-American actress, singer and fashion model 
 November 28 – Narumi Yasuda, Japanese actress
 November 29 – John Bradshaw Layfield, American professional wrestler

December

 December 1 - Larry Walker, Canadian baseball player, MLB Hall of Fame member
 December 3 – Adam Berry, American composer
 December 4 – Fred Armisen, American actor, comedian and musician
 December 5 – Patricia Kaas, French singer and actress
 December 7
 C. Thomas Howell, American actor and director
 Linn Ullmann, Norwegian journalist and author
 December 8
 Bushwick Bill, Jamaican-American rapper (d. 2019)
 Sinéad O'Connor, Irish pop singer
 Ralph Santolla, Italian-American metal guitarist (d. 2018)
 December 9 – Tim Bull, Australian politician
 December 10 
 Montserrat Gil Torné, Andorran politician
 Kirsten Gillibrand, American politician; United States Senator (D-NY)
 Julio Rodas, Guatemalan soccer player
 Gideon Sa'ar, Israeli politician
 Kadyrbek Sarbayev, foreign minister of Kyrgyzstan
 Natee Thongsookkaew, Thailand footballer
 December 12 
 Último Dragón, Japanese professional wrestler
 Lydia Zimmermann, Spanish filmmaker
 December 14 – Helle Thorning-Schmidt, Danish Prime Minister
 December 15 – Katja von Garnier, German film director
 December 17 – Miloš Tichý, Czech astronomer
 December 19
 Tim Sköld, Swedish multi-instrumentalist musician
 Alberto Tomba, Italian alpine skier
 December 20 – Ed de Goeij, Dutch footballer
 December 21 – Kiefer Sutherland, Canadian actor and film director
 December 22
 Din Beramboi, Malaysian comedian, actor and radio DJ (d. 2010) 
 Dmitry Bilozerchev, Soviet gymnast
 December 23 – Cláudia Raia, Brazilian actress, dancer and singer
 December 24 – Diedrich Bader, American actor and voice artist
 December 27 – Bill Goldberg, American professional wrestler
 December 28 – Kaliopi, Macedonian singer-songwriter
 December 31 – Maddie Taylor, American actress and comedian

Date unknown
 Guli Francis-Dehqani, Iranian-born Anglican diocesan bishop
 Julian Hooper, New Zealand artist
 Charbel Iskandar, Lebanese actor
 Kivi Larmola, Finnish artist

Deaths

January

 January 1 – Vincent Auriol, French politician, President of France (b. 1884)
 January 3
 Sammy Younge Jr., American civil rights activist (b. 1944)
 Marguerite Higgins, American journalist (b. 1920)
 Rex Lease, American actor (b. 1903)
 January 4 – Georges Theunis, 24th Prime Minister of Belgium (b. 1873)
 January 10 – Ignacy Oziewicz, Polish general (b. 1887)
 January 11
 Alberto Giacometti, Swiss sculptor and painter (b. 1901)
 Hannes Kolehmainen, Finnish Olympic athlete (b. 1889)
 Lal Bahadur Shastri, Indian activist, 2nd Prime Minister of India (b. 1904)
 January 14 
 Sergei Korolev, Soviet rocket engineer and spacecraft designer (b. 1907)
 Bill Carr, American Olympic athlete (b. 1909)
 January 15
 Samuel Akintola, Nigerian premier of the Western region and Aare Ona Kakanfo XIII of the Yoruba (assassinated) (b. 1910)
 Abubakar Tafawa Balewa, Nigerian politician, 1st Prime Minister of Nigeria (assassinated) (b. 1912)
 Ahmadu Bello, Nigerian premier of the Northern region (assassinated) (b. 1910)
 January 16 – Courtney Hodges, American army general (b. 1887)
 January 17 – Vincent J. Donehue, American stage director (b. 1917)
 January 18 – Kathleen Norris, American writer (b. 1880)
 January 22 – Herbert Marshall, English actor (b. 1890)
 January 25 – Saul Adler, Russian-born British-Israeli expert on parasitology (b. 1895)
 January 31
 Elizabeth Patterson, American actress (b. 1875)
 Arthur Percival, British general (b.1887)

February

 February 1
 Hedda Hopper, American actress and gossip columnist (b. 1885)
 Buster Keaton, American actor and film director (b. 1895)
 Joseph R. Knowland, American politician and newspaper publisher (b. 1873)
 February 3 – June Walker, American actress (b. 1900)
 February 5 – Louisa Martindale, British physician, writer, magistrate and prison commissioner (b. 1872)
 February 6 – Narcisa de León, Filipino film producer (b. 1877)
 February 9 – Sophie Tucker, Russian-born American singer (b. 1886)
 February 10 
 J. F. C. Fuller, British general and military strategist (b. 1878)
 Billy Rose, American composer and band leader (b. 1899)
 February 12 – Wilhelm Röpke, German economist (b. 1899)
 February 15 
 Gerard Ciołek, Polish architect and historian (b. 1909)
 Camilo Torres Restrepo, Colombian socialist and Roman Catholic priest (b. 1929)
 February 17
Alfred P. Sloan, American automobile industrialist (b. 1875)
Hans Hofmann, German-American painter (b. 1880)
 February 18 – Robert Rossen, American film director (b. 1908)
 February 20 – Chester W. Nimitz, American Navy admiral (b. 1885)
 February 25 – Victor Kravchenko, Soviet writer (b. 1905)
 February 26 
 Vinayak Damodar Savarkar, Indian pro-independence activist, Hindu nationalist (b. 1883)
 Gino Severini, Italian painter (b. 1883)
 February 28 
 Charles Bassett, American astronaut (b. 1931)
 Jonathan Hale, American actor (b. 1891)
 Elliot See, American astronaut (b. 1927)

March

 March 1
 Fritz Houtermans, German physicist (b. 1903)
 William R. Munroe, American admiral (b. 1886)
 Donald Stewart, American actor (b. 1910)
 March 3
 Joseph Fields, American playwright (b. 1895)
 William Frawley, American actor (I Love Lucy) (b. 1887)
 Alice Pearce, American actress (b. 1917)
 March 5 – Anna Akhmatova, Russian poet (b. 1889)
 March 7 – Donald B. Beary, American admiral (b. 1888)
 March 8
 William Astor, 3rd Viscount Astor, British politician (b. 1907)
 Abdel Hadi Al Gazzar, Egyptian painter (b. 1925)
 March 10
 Frank O'Connor, Irish writer (b. 1903)
 Frits Zernike, Dutch physicist, Nobel Prize laureate (b. 1888)
 March 12 – Néstor Guillén, Bolivian politician, 40th President of Bolivia (b. 1890)
 March 20
 Laurence Abrams, English professional footballer (b. 1889)
 Johnny Morrison, American professional baseball player (b. 1895)
 March 27 – Helen Menken, American actress (b. 1901)
 March 29 – Stylianos Gonatas, Prime Minister of Greece (b. 1876)
 March 30 – Erwin Piscator, German theater director (b. 1893)

April

 April 1 – Brian O'Nolan, Irish humorist (b. 1911)
 April 2 – C. S. Forester, English author (b. 1899)
 April 3 – Battista Farina, Italian car designer (b. 1893)
 April 6 – Julia Faye, American actress (b. 1893)
 April 10 – Evelyn Waugh, English author (b. 1903)
April 11 - William H. Pitsenbarger, United States Air Force Medal of Honour recipient (b. 1944)
 April 13
 Carlo Carrà, Italian painter (b. 1881)
 Georges Duhamel, French author (b. 1884)
 Abdul Salam Arif, Iraqi military officer and statesman, 2nd President of Iraq (b. 1921)
 April 17 – Mario Serandrei, Italian editor and screenwriter (b. 1907)
 April 19 – Javier Solís, Mexican singer and actor (b. 1931)
 April 20 – Prince Frederick of Prussia (b. 1911)
 April 21 – Sepp Dietrich, Nazi German military leader and SS commander (b. 1892)
 April 23 – George Ohsawa, Japanese dietist, founder of Macrobiotics (b. 1893)
 April 24 – Tino Pattiera, Yugoslav-born Italian tenor (b. 1890)
 April 29 – Eugene O'Brien, American actor (b. 1880)

May

 May 4 – Amédée Ozenfant, French painter (b. 1886)
 May 8 – Erich Pommer, German film producer (b. 1889)
 May 11 – Alfred Wintle, British army officer and eccentric (b. 1897)
 May 14 – Ludwig Meidner, German painter (b. 1884)
 May 15
 Venceslau Brás, 9th President of Brazil, leader in World War II (b. 1868) 
 Maximiliano Hernández Martínez, 30th President of El Salvador (assassinated) (b. 1882)
 Titien Sumarni, Indonesian actress (b. 1932)
 May 20 – Carlos Arruza, Mexican bullfighter (b. 1920)
 May 21 – Lady Dorothy Macmillan, spouse of the Prime Minister of the United Kingdom (b. 1900)
 May 22 – Tom Goddard, English cricketer (b. 1900)
 May 23 – Demchugdongrub, Mongolian politician (b. 1902)
 May 24 – Jim Barnes, English golf champion (b. 1886)
 May 25 – Vernon Sturdee, Australian general (b. 1890)
 May 29 – James Woolf, British film producer (b. 1919)

June

 June 1 – Papa Jack Laine, American jazz musician (b. 1873)
 June 3 – Nicholas Straussler, Hungarian engineer (b. 1891)
 June 6 – Ethel Clayton, American actress (b. 1882)
 June 7 – Jean Arp, Alsatian sculptor, painter and poet (b. 1886)
 June 8 – Anton Melik, Slovenian geographer (b. 1890)
 June 11 – Wallace Ford, English-born American actor (b. 1898)
 June 12 
 William Ernest Hocking, American philosopher (b. 1873)
 Hermann Scherchen, Austrian conductor (b. 1891)
 June 15 – Robert G. Fowler, American pioneer aviator (b. 1884)
 June 19 – Ed Wynn, American actor and comedian (b. 1886)
 June 20 – Georges Lemaître, Belgian priest and astrophysicist (b. 1894)
 June 30
 Margery Allingham, British detective fiction writer (b. 1904)
 Giuseppe Farina, Italian race car driver (b. 1906)

July

 July 2
 Jan Brzechwa, Polish poet (b. 1900)
 John the Wonderworker, Chinese Orthodox bishop, American archbishop and saint (b. 1896)
 July 3 – Deems Taylor, American composer (b. 1885)
 July 5 – George de Hevesy, Hungarian chemist, Nobel Prize laureate (b. 1885)
 July 7 – Carmelita Geraghty, American actress (b. 1901)
 July 9 – Venerable Marija Petković, Yugoslav Roman Catholic foundress and Servant of God (b. 1892)
 July 11 – Delmore Schwartz, American poet (b. 1913)
 July 12 – D. T. Suzuki, Japanese scholar and essayist (b. 1870)
 July 14 – Julie Manet, French painter (b. 1878)
 July 18 – Bobby Fuller, American rock and roll musician (b. 1942)
 July 21 
 Francesco Paolo Cantelli, Italian mathematician (b. 1875)
 Philipp Frank, Austrian physicist and mathematician (b. 1884)
 July 23 
 Montgomery Clift, American actor (b. 1920)
 Douglass Montgomery, American actor (b. 1907)
 July 25 – Frank O'Hara, American poet (b. 1926)
 July 29 – Johnson Aguiyi-Ironsi, Nigerian head of state (b. 1924)
 July 31
 Alexander von Falkenhausen, German general and military advisor, 20 July Plotter (b. 1878)
 Bud Powell, American jazz pianist (b. 1924)

August

 August 1 – Charles Whitman, American mass murderer (b. 1941)
 August 3 – Lenny Bruce, American comedian (b. 1925)
 August 6 – Cordwainer Smith, American author (b. 1913)
 August 12 – Artur Alliksaar, Estonian poet (b. 1923)
 August 15
 Jan Kiepura, Polish tenor and actor (b. 1902)
 Seena Owen, American actress (b. 1894)
 August 17 – Ken Miles, British sports car racing engineer and driver (b. 1918)
 August 19 – Fritz Bleyl, German painter (b. 1880)
 August 23 – Francis X. Bushman, American actor (b. 1883)
 August 24 
 Tadeusz Bór-Komorowski, Polish general and statesman, 33rd Prime Minister of Poland (b. 1895)
 Vicente Mejía Colindres, 29th President of Honduras (b. 1878)
 August 26 – Art Baker, American actor (b. 1898)

September

 September 6
 Margaret Sanger, American birth control advocate (b. 1879)
 Hendrik Verwoerd, 2nd Prime Minister of South Africa (b. 1901)
 September 14
 Gertrude Berg, American actress (b. 1899)
 Hiram Wesley Evans, American Ku Klux Klan Imperial Wizard (b. 1881)
 Cemal Gürsel, Turkish general and statesman, 10th Prime Minister of Turkey and 4th President of Turkey (b. 1895)
 September 17 – Fritz Wunderlich, German tenor (b. 1930)
 September 19 – Vladimir Grigoryevich Fyodorov, Soviet scientist and general (b. 1874)
 September 21 – Paul Reynaud, French lawyer and politician, 77th Prime Minister of France (b. 1878)
 September 26
 Maghfoor Ahmad Ajazi, Indian Independence activist (b. 1900)
 Helen Kane, American singer (b. 1904)
 September 28
 André Breton, French poet and writer (b. 1896)
 Eric Fleming, American actor (b. 1925)

October

 October 10 
 Charlotte Cooper, English tennis champion (b. 1870)
 Wilfrid Lawson, English actor (b. 1900)
 October 13 – Clifton Webb, American actor, dancer and singer (b. 1889)
 October 16 – George O'Hara, American actor (b. 1899)
 October 17 – Cléo de Mérode, French dancer (b. 1875)
 October 18 – Elizabeth Arden, Canadian-born American beautician and cosmetics entrepreneur (b. 1878)
 October 23 – Claire McDowell, American silent screen actress (b. 1877)
 October 24 – Hans Dreier, German art director (b. 1885)
 October 26 – Alma Cogan, English singer (b. 1932)
 October 28 – Robert Charpentier, French Olympic cyclist (b. 1916)

November

 November 2
 Peter Debye, Dutch chemist, Nobel Prize laureate (b. 1884)
 Mississippi John Hurt, African American singer and guitarist (b. 1893)
 November 5 – Dietrich von Choltitz, Nazi German military governor of Paris in World War II (b. 1894)
 November 8 – Bernhard Zondek German-born Israeli gynecologist, developer of first reliable pregnancy test (b. 1891)
 November 13 – Esna Boyd, Australian tennis player (b. 1899)
 November 14 
 Steingrímur Steinþórsson, 11th Prime Minister of Iceland (b. 1893)
 Zengo Yoshida, Japanese admiral (b. 1885)
 November 21 – Władysław Bortnowski, Polish historian and military commander (b. 1891)
 November 23 – Seán T. O'Kelly, 2nd President of Ireland (b. 1882)
 November 26 – Siegfried Kracauer, German writer, sociologist and critic (b. 1889)
 November 28 – Boris Podolsky, Russian-American physicist (b. 1896)

December

 December 2 – L.E.J. Brouwer, Dutch mathematician and philosopher (b. 1881)
 December 6 – Juan Natalicio González, Paraguayan poet, 37th President of Paraguay (b. 1897)
 December 14 – Verna Felton, American actress (b. 1890)
 December 15 – Walt Disney, American animated film producer and founder of The Walt Disney Company and Disneyland Resort (b. 1901)
 December 19 – Betty Kuuskemaa, Estonian actress (b. 1879)
 December 22
 Harry Beaumont, American film director (b. 1888)
 Lucy Burns, American women's rights campaigner (b. 1879)
 December 26 – Herbert Gille, SS German general (b. 1897)
 December 27 – Guillermo Stábile, Argentine football player and manager (b. 1905)
 December 30 – Christian Herter, United States Secretary of State (b. 1895)

Nobel Prizes

 Physics – Alfred Kastler
 Chemistry – Robert S. Mulliken
 Physiology or Medicine – Peyton Rous and Charles Brenton Huggins
 Literature – Shmuel Yosef Agnon and Nelly Sachs
 Peace – not awarded

References